The events of 1978 in anime.

Events
September 14 - Artland is created

Releases

See also
1978 in animation

External links 
Japanese animated works of the year, listed in the IMDb

Anime
Anime
Years in anime